is an English contract law and English land law judicial decision of the Court of Appeal concerning agreement and the right to specific performance of an assurance that is relied on.

Facts
Mr Errington in 1936 bought a house in Milvain Avenue, Newcastle upon Tyne, for his son and daughter in law, paying £250, and the remaining £500 coming from a mortgage, paid off with 15s a week by the newly weds. Mr Errington promised them they could stay in occupation as long as they paid the mortgage and that when all the instalments were paid it would be theirs. He gave her the building society book and said, ‘Don't part with this book. The house will be your property when the mortgage is paid.’ He died and the son left to move in with his mother. The mother sought possession from the daughter in law.

The Judge dismissed the claim for possession.

Judgment
The three-judge panel in the Court of Appeal unanimously held that the daughter in law did not have to move out of the house, because she was entitled to stay and pay off the mortgage as part of a binding agreement with the father, for varying reasons.

Somervell LJ gave the initial (first read) judgment of the panel.

Denning LJ held this was no mere tenancy at will; the father could not have revoked his promise once the couple had begun performing the act of paying off the mortgage instalments. The promise would only cease to bind him if they left their part of the promise incomplete and unperformed. The 15s a week was not rent, they were not bound to pay it, the father could only refuse to transfer them the house. The couple were licensees, but they acquired an equitable right to remain as long as they paid instalments, which would mature into a good equitable title once the mortgage was paid. The father made a unilateral contract, which could not be revoked once they began performance, but would cease to bind him if they did not perform their side. Although they had exclusive possession, they were licensees because they only have a mere personal privilege to remain, with no right to assign or sub let. But they were not bare licensees, rather than contractual licensees. He said there was no need to imply an obligation to complete the payments. The limit is where the daughter stops paying, and the father’s estate has to pick up the bill. Then she would lose her right to stay. The couple were on a licence, short of a tenancy but a contractual, or at least equitable right to remain, which would grow into good equitable title as soon as the mortgage was paid. The rule that a licence could always be revoked at will was ‘altered owing to the interposition of equity.’ His judgment continued:

Hodson LJ gave a short concurring judgment.

See also

English contract law
Carlill v Carbolic Smoke Ball Co
English land law

References

English contract case law
English land case law
Lord Denning cases
1955 in case law
1955 in British law
Court of Appeal (England and Wales) cases